East Davidson High School (commonly referred to as "East") is a public high school in Thomasville, North Carolina. The students of East Davidson are known as the Golden Eagles. The colors for East Davidson are gold, black, and white.

Athletics

East Davidson is a member of the 2A Central Carolina Conference. The sports teams of East Davidson are:

Baseball
Basketball
Cross country
Football
Golf
Soccer
Softball
Swimming
Tennis
Track and field
Volleyball
Wrestling

Sporting achievements

Notable alumni
Chad Barefoot, North Carolina senator representing the 18th District
Victoria Livengood, mezzo-soprano and voice teacher

References

Public high schools in North Carolina
Schools in Davidson County, North Carolina